The Hague Ethical Guidelines is a set of ethical principles regarding responsible conduct in the chemical sciences and to guard against the misuse of chemistry. The guidelines were developed by a group of chemical practitioners from around the world together with the Organisation for the Prohibition of Chemical Weapons, and are endorsed by the International Union of Pure and Applied Chemistry.

References

Ethics of science and technology
Organisation for the Prohibition of Chemical Weapons